The 2010–11 AL-Bank Ligaen season was the 54th season of ice hockey in Denmark. Eight teams participated in the league, and the Herning Blue Fox won the championship..

First round

Second round

Group A

Group B

Playoffs

Semifinals 
SønderjyskE Ishockey - Frederikshavn White Hawks 2:4 (1:2, 4:1, 0:2, 2:1, 1:3, 0:3)
Herning Blue Fox - Rødovre Mighty Bulls 4:1 (3:4, 5:1, 4:0, 1:0, 4:0)

3rd place 

SønderjyskE Ishockey - Rødovre Mighty Bulls 2:2, 2:0

Final 
Herning Blue Fox - Frederikshavn White Hawks 4:1 (1:2, 4:3, 3:0, 5:3, 4:3)

External links
HockeyArchives.info

Dan
2010 in Danish sport
2011 in Danish sport